Paul Wood may refer to:

 Paul Wood (footballer) (born 1964), English former footballer
 Paul Wood (rugby league) (born 1981), English rugby league footballer
 Paul Wood (journalist), correspondent for the BBC
 Paul Hamilton Wood (1907–1962), Australian cardiologist
 Paul Wood (author), New Zealand motivational speaker, author, life coach, and psychologist

See also 
 List of people with surname Wood